Pratapgarh or Partabgarh may refer to the following places in India:

States rajasthan , cities and towns
 Pratapgarh, Rajasthan, formerly eponymous capital of 
 Pratapgarh State, a Rajputana princely state

a medieval kingdom in what is now north-east India and Bangladesh

Constituencies
 [[Pratapgarh (Lok Sabha dausa 
constituency)]], a parliamentary constituency in rajasthan

State Assembly constituencies
 Thanagazi (Assembly constituency) of rajasthan

Districts
 Alwar district, Rajasthan
 Pratapgarh taluka,

Other places
 Pratapgad, a fort in alwar district, rajasthan 
 Pratapgarh, near tourist places is bhangarh and sariska tiger reserve, Pratapgarh Ford also a tourister likey place

Other uses
 Battle of Pratapgarh

See also 
 Bela Pratapgarh, Uttar Pradesh